Aquatic plants are used to give the freshwater aquarium a natural appearance, oxygenate the water, absorb ammonia, and provide habitat for fish, especially fry (babies) and for invertebrates. Some aquarium fish and invertebrates also eat live plants. Hobbyists use aquatic plants for aquascaping, of several aesthetic styles.

Most of these plant species are found either partially or fully submerged in their natural habitat. Although there are a handful of obligate aquatic plants that must be grown entirely underwater, most can grow fully emersed if the soil is moist. Though some are just living at the water margins, still, they can live in the completely submerged habitat.

By scientific name
The taxonomy of most plant genera is not final. Scientific names listed here may, therefore, contradict other sources. Many of these species are dangerous invasives and should be disposed of in a way that guarantees that they will not enter local waters. 

Common aquarium plant species:

Aciotis acuminifolia
Acmella repens 
Acorus calamus (Common sweet flag) Acorus gramineus (Japanese sweet flag) 
Aldrovanda vesiculosa
Alisma canaliculatum 
Alisma gramineum
Alisma lanceolatum
Alisma nanum
Alisma orientale
Alisma plantago-aquatica
Alisma subcordatum
Alisma triviale
Alisma wahlenbergii
Alternanthera bettzickiana
Alternanthera philoxeroides
Alternanthera reineckii
Alternanthera sessilis
Ammania capitellata
Ammannia crassicaulis (Synonym Nesaea crassicaulis)
Ammania gracilis (Delicate ammania, red ammania)
Ammania latifolia
Ammannia pedicellata
Ammannia praetemissa
Ammania senegalensis
Anubias afzelii (Narrow-leafed anubias)
Anubias barteri var. barteri (Broadleaved anubias)
Anubias barteri var. angustifolia
Anubias barteri var. caladiifolia
Anubias barteri var. glabra
Anubias barteri var. nana (Dwarf anubias)
Anubias gigantea
Anubias gilletti
Anubias gracilis
Anubias hastifolia
Anubias heterophylla
Anubias pynaertii
Aponogeton appendiculatus
Aponogeton bernierianus
Aponogeton boivinianus
Aponogeton capuronii
Aponogeton crispus (Crinkled or ruffled aponogeton)
Aponogeton decartyi
Aponogeton desertorum
Aponogeton dioecus
Aponogeton distachyos
Aponogeton elongatus
Aponogeton fenestralis
Aponogeton henkelianus
Aponogeton junceus
Aponogeton longiplumulosus
Aponogeton loriae
Aponogeton madagascariensis (Madagascar laceleaf, lace plant)
Aponogeton natans
Aponogeton rigidifolius
Aponogeton tenuispicatus
Aponogeton ulvaceus (Compact apongeton)
Aponogeton undulatus
Armoracia aquatica
Arthraxon hispidus
Azolla caroliniana (water velvet, mosquito fern)
Azolla filiculoïdes (Azolla, moss fern)
Azolla pinnata
Bacopa amplexicaulis
Bacopa australis
Bacopa caroliniana (lemon bacopa, water hyssop, giant bacopa)
Bacopa crenata
Bacopa innominata
Bacopa lanigera
Bacopa madagascarensis
Bacopa monnieri (water hyssop, dwarf bacopa, baby tears)
Bacopa myriophylloides
Bacopa rotundifolia (Round bacopa)
Bacopa salzmannii
Bacopa serpyllifolia
Baldellia ranunculoides
Barclaya longifolia (Orchid lily)
Barclaya motleyi
Berula erecta
Blyxa aubertii
Blyxa echinosperma
Blyxa japonica (Japanese rush)
Blyxa novoguineensis
Blyxa octandra
Bolbitis heteroclita (sometimes sold as B. asiatica)
Bolbitis heudelotii (African or Congo fern)
Bucephalandra gigantea
Bucephalandra motleyana
Bucephalandra catherineae
Cabomba aquatica (Yellow cabomba, giant cabomba)
Cabomba caroliniana (Green cabomba)
Cabomba furcata
Cabomba palaeformis
Cabomba piauhyensis (Red cabomba)
Caldesia parnassifolia
Calla palustris
Caltha palustris
Callitriche hamulata
Callitriche hermaphroditica
Callitriche palustris
Callitriche stagnalis
Callitriche terestris
Cardamine lyrata (Chinese ivy, Japanese cress)
Cardamine rotundifolia
Ceratophyllum demersum (hornwort)
Ceratophyllum submersum (tropical hornwort)
Ceratopteris cornuta
Ceratopteris pteridoides
Ceratopteris thalictroides (water sprite)
Cladophora aegagropila
Clinopodium brownei
Crassula aquatica
Crassula helmsii
Crinum calamistratum
Crinum natans (African onion plant)
Crinum purpurascens
Crinum thaianum (water onion)
Cryptocoryne affinis
Cryptocoryne alba
Cryptocoryne albida
Cryptocoryne aponogetifolia
Cryptocoryne auriculata
Cryptocoryne axelrodii
Cryptocoryne balansae
Cryptocoryne beckettii (Beckett's Cryptocoryne)
Cryptocoryne blassii
Cryptocoryne bogneri
Cryptocoryne bullosa
Cryptocoryne ciliata
Cryptocoryne cognata
Cryptocoryne cordata (Giant cryptocoryne)
Cryptocoryne crispatula
Cryptocoryne cruddasiana
Cryptocoryne dewitii
Cryptocoryne diderici
Cryptocoryne elliptica
Cryptocoryne ferruginea
Cryptocoryne fusca
Cryptocoryne gasserii
Cryptocoryne grabowskii
Cryptocoryne gracilis
Cryptocoryne griffithii
Cryptocoryne hudoroi
Cryptocoryne keei
Cryptocoryne legroi
Cryptocoryne lingua
Cryptocoryne longicauda
Cryptocoryne lucens
Cryptocoryne lutea
Cryptocoryne minima
Cryptocoryne moehlmannii (Moehlmann's cryptocoryne)
Cryptocoryne nevillii
Cryptocoryne nurii
Cryptocoryne pallidinervia
Cryptocoryne parva (Tiny cryptocoryne)
Cryptocoryne petchii
Cryptocoryne pontederiifolia
Cryptocoryne purpurea
Cryptocoryne retrospiralis
Cryptocoryne schulzei
Cryptocoryne scrurillis
Cryptocoryne siamensis
Cryptocoryne spiralis
Cryptocoryne striolata
Cryptocoryne thwaitesii
Cryptocoryne tonkinensis
Cryptocoryne undulata (Undulate cryptocoryne)
Cryptocoryne usteriana
Cryptocoryne venemae
Cryptocoryne versteegii
Cryptocoryne walkeri
Cryptocoryne wendtii 'Tropica'
Cryptocoryne x willisii
Cryptocoryne zewaldiae
Cryptocoryne zonata
Cryptocoryne zukalii
Cuphea anagalloidea
Cyperus alternifolius
Cyperus helferi
Cyperus papyrus
Damasonium alisma
Didiplis diandra (Water hedge)
Diodia kuntzei
Diodia virginiana
Echinodorus africanus
Echinodorus amazonicus (Amazon sword)
Echinodorus andrieuxii
Echinodorus angustifolius
Echinodorus argentinensis
Echinodorus aschersonianus
Echinodorus barthii
Echinodorus berteroi
Echinodorus bleheri (Broadleaved amazon)
Echinodorus brevipedicellatus
Echinodorus cordifolius (Radicans sword, spade leaf sword)
Echinodorus fluitans
Echinodorus grandiflorus (Large-flowered amazon)
Echinodorus horemanii (Black-red amazon)
Echinodorus horizontalis
Echinodorus humilis
Echinodorus latifolius
Echinodorus longiscapus
Echinodorus macrophyllus (Large-leaved amazon sword)
Echinodorus martii
Echinodorus major (Ruffled amazon sword)
Echinodorus opacus (Opaque amazon sword)
Echinodorus osiris (Red amazon sword)
Echinodorus 'Ozelot'
Echinodorus palaefolius
Echinodorus paniculatus
Echinodorus parviflorus (Black amazon sword)
Echinodorus pelliscidus
Echinodorus quadricostatus (Dwarf sword)
Echinodorus radicans
Echinodorus rigidifolius
Echinodorus 'Rubin'
Echinodorus rubra
Echinodorus schlueteri
Echinodorus subalatus
Echinodorus tunicatus
Echinodorus uruguayensis (Uruguay amazon sword)
Egeria densa (Elodea, pondweed)
Egeria najas
Egleria fluctuans
Eichhornia azurea
Eichhornia crassipes (Water hyacinth)
Eichhornia diversifolia
Elatine gussonei
Elatine hydropiper
Elatine macropoda
Elatine triandra
Eleocharis acicularis (Hairgrass)
Eleocharis dulcis
Eleocharis minima
Eleocharis obtusa
Eleocharis parvula
Eleocharis vivipara
Elodea canadensis (Canadian pondweed)
Elodea granatensis
Elodea nuttallii
Elodea occidentalis
Equisetum spp.
Eriocaulon amanoanum
Eriocaulon cinereum
Eriocaulon depressum
Eriocaulon parkeri
Eusteralis stellata (Star rotala)
Fittonia argyroneura
Fontinalis antipyretica (Willow moss)
Glossadelphus zollingeri
Glossostigma diandrum
Glossostigma elatinoides
Gratiola amphiantha
Gratiola brevefolia
Gratiola viscidula
Gymnocoronis spilanthoides (Spadeleaf plant)
Helanthium bolivianum (Bolivian sword) (Synonym - Echinodorus bolivianus)
Helanthium tenellum (Pygmy chain sword) (Synonym - Echinodorus tenellus)
Helanthium zombiense  
Hemianthus callitrichoides (Dwarf helzine) 
Hemianthus micranthemoides (Pearlweed)
Heteranthera dubia
Heteranthera reniformis
Heteranthera zosterifolia (Stargrass)
Hippuris vulgaris
Hottonia inflata
Hottonia palustris (Water violet)
Hydrilla verticillata
Hydrocharis morsus-ranae
Hydrocleys martii
Hydrocleys nymphoides
Hydrocotyle leucocephala (Brazilian pennywort)
Hydrocotyle sibthorpioides
Hydrocotyle tripartita
Hydrocotyle verticillata (Whorled umbrella plant)
Hydrocotyle vulgaris
Hydrothrix gardneri
Hydrotriche hottoniiflora
Hygrophila angustifolia
Hygrophila corymbosa 'crispa'
Hygrophila corymbosa 'glabra' (Broadlead giant stricta)
Hygrophila corymbosa 'gracilis'
Hygrophila corymbosa 'siamensis'
Hygrophila corymbosa 'strigosa'
Hygrophila difformis (Water wisteria)
Hygrophila guianensis
Hygrophila lacustris
Hygrophila lancea
Hygrophila natalis
Hygrophila polysperma (Dwarf hygrophilia)
Hygrophila salicifolia
Hygrophila stricta (Thai stricta, green stricta)
Hygroryza aristata
Hyptis lorentziana
Iris spp.
Isoetes lacustris (quillwort)
Isoetes malinverniana
Isoetes taiwanensis
Isoetes velata
Isolepis setracea
Jasarum steyermarkii
Juncus repens
Lagarosiphon cordofanus
Lagarosiphon madagascariensis
Lagarosiphon major (Elodea crispa)
Lagenandra dewitii
Lagenandra insignis
Lagenandra koenigii
Lagenandra lancifolia
Lagenandra meeboldii
Lagenandra nairii
Lagenandra ovata
Lagenandra thwaitesii
Lemna gibba
Lemna minor (Duckweed)
Lemna paucicostata
Lemna perpusilla
Lemna trisulca
Lilaeopsis brasiliensis
Lilaeopsis carolinensis
Lilaeopsis macloviana
Lilaeopsis mauritiana
Lilaeopsis novae-zelandiae (New Zealand grassplant)
Lilaeopsis ruthiana
Limnobium laevigatum (Amazon frogbit)
Limnobium spongia
Limnocharis flava
Limnophila aquatica (Giant ambulia)
Limnophila aromatica
Limnophila glabra
Limnophila heterophylla
Limnophila indica (Indian ambulia)
Limnophila sessiliflora (Dwarf ambulia)
Limnophyton fluitans
Lindernia crustacea F. Muell.
Lindernia dubia
Lindernia grandiflora
Lindernia parviflora
Lindernia rotundifolia
Littorella uniflora
Lobelia cardinalis (Cardinal flower, scarlet lobelia)
Lobelia dortmanna
Lomariopsis sp. (Süsswassertang)
Ludwigia alternifolia
Ludwigia arcuata
Ludwigia glandulosa (Glandular ludwigia, red star ludwigia)
Ludwigia helminthorrhiza
Ludwigia inclinata
Ludwigia inclinata var. verticellata 'Cuba'
Ludwigia mullertii
Ludwigia natans
Ludwigia sedioides
Ludwigia palustris
Ludwigia pulvinaris
Ludwigia repens (Creeping ludwigia, narrow-leaf ludwigia)
Luronium natans
Lycopodiella inundata (Lycopodium inundatum)
Lysimachia nummularia (creeping Jenny, moneywort)
Marsilea crenata
Marsilea drummondii
Marsilea hirsuta
Marsilea pubescens
Marsilea quadrifolia (water-clover)
Mayaca fluviatilis
Mayaca madida (Synonym Mayaca sellowiana)
Mayaca vandellii
Mentha aquatica
Micranthemum umbrosum (Helzine)
Microcarpaea minima
Microsorum pteropus (Java fern)
Monochoria vaginalis
Monosolenium tenerum (commercial name; plants sold under this name are actually a fern Lomariopsis sp.)
Murdannia keisak
Myriophyllum alterniflorum
Myriophyllum aquaticum (Brazilian milfoil, milfoil)
Myriophyllum elatinoides
Myriophyllum heterophyllum
Myriophyllum hippuroides (Green milfoil, water milfoil)
Myriophyllum mattogrossense
Myriophyllum proserpinacoides
Myriophyllum scabratum (Foxtail)
Myriophyllum spicatum
Myriophyllum tuberculatum (Red myriophyllum)
Myriophyllum ussuriense
Myriophyllum verticillatum
Myriophylumm oguraense
Najas graminea
Najas guadelupensis
Najas indica
Najas marina
Najas minor
Najas pectinata
Nechamandra alternifolia
Nelumbo nucifera
Neptunia oleracea
Nitella capillaris
Nitella flexilis
Nitella gracilis
Nomaphila siamensis
Nuphar advenum
Nuphar japonica (Spatterdock)
Nuphar lutea (Yellow water-lily)
Nuphar pumilum
Nuphar sagittifolium
Nymphaea alba
Nymphaea lotus (Tiger lotus)
Nymphaea lotus var. rubra
Nymphaea micrantha
Nymphaea pubescens
Nymphaea pygmea
Nymphaea stellata (Red and blue water lily)
Nymphaea zenkeri 'Red' (Red tiger lotus)
Nymphoides aquatica (Banana plant)
Nymphoides humboldtiana
Nymphoides indica
Nymphoides peltata
Oenanthe javanica
Oenanthe aquatica
Oldenlandia salzmannii (Synonym Hedyotis salzmannii)
Orontium aquaticum
Ottelia alismoides
Ottelia mesenterum
Ottelia ulvifolia
Penthorum sedoides
Persicaria hydropiperoides
Persicaria praetermissa
Pilularia americana
Pilularia globulifera
Pistia stratiotes (Water lettuce)
Phyllanthus fluitans
Physostegia purpurea
Pogostemon helferi
Pogostemon stellatus
Pontederia cordata
Potamogeton coloratus
Potamogeton crispus
Potamogeton densus
Potamogeton filiformis
Potamogeton gayi
Potamogeton gramineus
Potamogeton lucens
Potamogeton malaianus
Potamogeton natans
Potamogeton perfoliatus
Proserpinaca palustris
Ranunculus aquatilis
Ranunculus limosella
Regnellidium diphyllum
Riccia fluitans (Crystalwort)
Ricciocarpos natans
Rorippa aquatica
Rotala indica
Rotala macrandra (Giant red rotala)
Rotala mexicana
Rotala ramosior
Rotala rotundifolia (Dwarf rotala)
Rotala pusilla
Rotala wallichii (Whorly rotala)
Ruppia maritima
Sagittaria chapmani
Sagittaria eatonii
Sagittaria filiformis
Sagittaria graminea
Sagittaria guyanensis
Sagittaria isoëtiformis
Sagittaria latifolia
Sagittaria microfila
Sagittaria montevidensis
Sagittaria natans
Sagittaria papillosa
Sagittaria platyphylla (giant sagittaria)
Sagittaria pusilla (dwarf sagittaria)
Sagittaria sagittifolia
Sagittaria subulata (needle sagittaria, floating arrowhead)
Salvinia auriculata
Salvinia cucullata
Salvinia minima
Salvinia natans (water spangles)
Salvinia oblongifolia
Salvinia rotundifolia
Samolus valerandi (Water cabbage)
Saururus cernuus (Lizard's tail)
Schismatoglottis prietoi
Selaginella sp.
Sium floridanum 
Sium latifolium
Shinnersia rivularis (Mexican oak leaf)
Spiranthes romanzoffiana
Spirodela polyrhiza
Staurogyne repens
Staurogyne stolonifera
Stratiotes aloides
Stuckenia vaginata
Subularia aquatica
Syngonanthus caulescens
Synnema triflorum (out of date synonym)
Taxiphyllum barbieri (Java moss)
Tonina fluviatilis
Trapa natans (Water chestnut)
Triglochin maritima
Triglochin palustris
Triglochin striata
Trithuria austinensis
Trithuria austinensis
Trithuria australis
Trithuria inconspicua
Typha angustifolia
Typha latifolia
Utricularia bifida
Utricularia gibba
Utricularia graminifolia
Utricularia minor
Utricularia vulgaris
Vallisneria americana (Dwarf vallisneria)
Vallisneria asiatica
Vallisneria asiatica var. biwaensis (Corkscrew vallisneria)
Vallisneria gigantea (Giant vallisneria)
Vallisneria neotropicalis
Vallisneria rubra
Vallisneria spiralis (Straight vallisneria)
Vallisneria tortifolia (Twisted vallisneria, dwarf vallisneria)
Vallisneria tortissima 
Vesicularia montagnei (Christmas moss, Xmas moss)
Veronica americana
Wolffia arrhiza
Wolffia microscopica
Wolffiella floridana
Zannichellia palustris

False aquatics or pseudo-aquarium plants
Several species of terrestrial plants are frequently sold as "aquarium plants". While such plants are beautiful and can survive and even flourish for months under water, they will eventually die and must be removed so their decay does not contaminate the aquarium water. These plants have no necessary biology to live underwater.

Aglaonema modestum (Chinese evergreen)
Aglaonema simplex
Chlorophytum bichetii (Pongol sword)
Dracaena sanderiana (Striped dragonplant)
Hemigraphis colorata (Crimson ivy)
Ophiopogon japonicus (Fountain plant)
Pilea cadierei (Aluminum plant)
Sciadopitys verticillata) (Umbrella pine, koyamaki)
Spathiphyllum tasson (Brazil sword)
Syngonium podophyllum (Stardust ivy)
Trichomanes javanicum

Images

Photos

Illustration

References

See also 

 List of freshwater aquarium fish species

Fishkeeping
 Aqaurium
Freshwater aquarium plant species
freshwater plant